The Old Orange County Courthouse, at one point also known as the Santa Ana County Courthouse, is a Romanesque Revival building that was opened in September 1901 and is located in Santa Ana's Historic Downtown District on Civic Center and Broadway streets. The Old Orange County Courthouse is officially recognized as California Historical Landmark No. 837 and is also on the National Register of Historic Places.

History
Orange County, California, was formed in 1889 by William Spurgeon and James McFadden and Santa Ana was chosen as the county seat of government because of its larger growth as a town over surrounding towns, especially Orange.

Museum
The courthouse now stands as a museum and has been used as a favorite location for different movies and television shows. It features as the exterior of Briarcliff Manor in American Horror Story: Asylum. In 1949 the courthouse exterior and interior were used for location filming for The File on Thelma Jordan.

Gallery

See also
Downtown Santa Ana Historic Districts
Santa Ana, California
National Register of Historic Places listings in Orange County, California

References

Further reading

External links

Orange County Parks: Old Orange County Courthouse
Santa Ana Historical Preservation Society

Buildings and structures in Santa Ana, California
History of Santa Ana, California
Museums in Orange County, California
History museums in California
History of Orange County, California
California Historical Landmarks
Courthouses on the National Register of Historic Places in California
National Register of Historic Places in Orange County, California
Government buildings completed in 1901
Romanesque Revival architecture in California